Louis Finot may refer to:

 Louis Finot (archeologist) (1864–1935), French archeologist
 Louis Finot (footballer) (1909–1996), French soccer player